HMS Meteor was a  built for the Royal Navy during the 1820s. In July 1832 she was renamed Beacon and reclassified as a survey ship, and was sold in 1846.

Description
The ship's tonnage was 378 tons burthen. The Hecla class was armed with two 6-pounder cannon, eight or ten 24-pounder carronades and two mortars, one  and the other  in size. The ships had a crew of 67 officers and ratings.

Construction and career
Meteor, the third ship of her name to serve in the Royal Navy, was ordered on 18 May 1819, laid down in May 1820 at Pembroke Dockyard, Wales, and launched on 25 June 1823. She was completed for sea on 17 June 1824 at Plymouth Dockyard.

Notes

References

Bomb vessels of the Royal Navy
1823 ships
Ships built in Pembroke Dock